Jalama Wines is a California wine estate producing various Rhône style blends and varietal wines. The winery is located in Lompoc, California, 45 minutes north of Santa Barbara and the vineyard, located near Jalama Beach, is the westernmost vineyard in Santa Barbara County. The vineyard is widely known for its hands-on farming techniques.

History
The Jalama valley, formerly part of an old Spanish land grant named Rancho San Julian, sits just a few miles from the Pacific. The area has a rich history of cattle ranching, farming and wine production dating back to the time of the first California missions. A few of the original vines first planted by the natives of La Purisima Misson still remain nearby.
Jalama Vineyard is on a portion of the family-owned and operated Cargasacchi ranch which includes the Cargasacchi Vineyard in the Sta. Rita Hills. The westernmost vineyard in Santa Barbara County, Jalama Vineyard is close to Jalama Beach and Point Conception. This unique region is surrounded by the Pacific Ocean on three sides, resulting in foggy nights and cool, breezy days making the area ideal for growing Pinot noir and Pinot gris.

Starting in 1990, wine maker, Mark Cargasacchi consulted for other notable wineries in the Santa Ynez Valley until his estate began bottling the Jalama label in 2004. Jalama wines has made an impact with wine sales through the use of online social media markets.

Production
Within a  area, the vineyard area extends , planted with varieties Syrah, Pinot noir, Pinot gris and Viognier. Additional grapes Syrah, Cabernet Sauvignon and Mourvèdre are sourced from vineyards located in the Santa Rita Hills.

References

External links
 Jalama Wines official site

Wineries in California
Companies based in Santa Barbara County, California